Michael Alber Dasmariñas is a Filipino professional boxer who held the IBO bantamweight title in 2018. He also challenged for the IBO super-flyweight title in 2014 and the unified WBA (Super), IBF, and The Ring bantamweight titles in 2021.

Professional career
Dasmariñas made his professional debut on 15 January 2012, scoring a four-round unanimous decision (UD) victory against Wilmar Pragata in Lipas, Philippines.

After compiling a record of 18–1 (11 KOs), he faced reigning champion Lwandile Sityatha for the IBO super-flyweight title on 13 December 2014 at the Orient Theater in East London, South Africa. The bout was placed in jeopardy when, while in the changing room before the fight, Sityatha began vomiting. After recovering he went on to defeat Dasmariñas via twelve-round split decision (SD). One judge scored the bout 118–110 in favour of Dasmariñas while the other two scored it 116–112 for Sityatha.

Following two stoppage wins, Dasmariñas faced Jhaleel Payao for the WBC Youth super-flyweight title on 12 July 2015 at the Mandaluyong Sports Center in Mandaluyong, Philippines. After suffering a cut above his right eye in the sixth round due to an accidental clash of heads, Dasmariñas captured the WBC Youth title via ten-round UD, with the judges' scorecards reading 97–92, 96–93, 96–93.

He made one successful defence of his title before defeating Edison Berwela via third-round corner retirement (RTD), capturing the vacant Philippines Boxing Federation (PBF) interim super-flyweight title on 7 March 2016 at the Town Plaza in San Fernando, Philippines. Dasmariñas moved up a weight class for his next fight, defeating Jecker Buhawe via fourth-round technical knockout (TKO) to capture the vacant PBF bantamweight title on 29 April 2016 in Muntinlupa, Philippines.

After three more wins he faced Karim Guerfi for the vacant IBO bantamweight title on 20 April 2018 at the Indoor Stadium in Singapore. Dasmariñas scored a fourth-round knockout (KO) victory to capture his first world title.

Four fights later he faced reigning champion Naoya Inoue on 19 June 2021 for the unified WBA (Super), IBF, and The Ring bantamweight titles at the Virgin Hotels Las Vegas. Dasmariñas was knocked to the floor in the second round after Inoue landed a left hook. He was knocked down twice more in the third, both from a body punch, with the latter prompting the referee to call a halt to the contest, handing Dasmariñas a third-round KO loss.

Professional boxing record

References

External links

Living people
Year of birth missing (living people)
Date of birth missing (living people)
Sportspeople from Camarines Sur
Filipino male boxers
Super-flyweight boxers
Bantamweight boxers
International Boxing Organization champions